Sandbumoen iis a village in Sel Municipality in Innlandet county, Norway. The European route E6 highway and the Dovrebanen railway line both pass through the village.

References

Sel
Villages in Innlandet